Black Girl is a play by American playwright J. E. Franklin. It was first produced on public television in 1969, followed by an off-Broadway production in 1971. It was later adapted by the playwright as a feature film that was released the following year.

Plot synopsis
A family drama about a young woman who defies the low expectations thrust upon her and pursues her dream of becoming a dancer.

Television production
Produced by WGBH, Boston in 1969.  The teleplay featured Yvette Franklin, Joan Sandler, Barbara Griffith, and Judy Mills.

Original Off-Broadway production
Directed by Shauneille Perry
Produced by New Federal Theatre
Producers: Bert Beck, Woodie King Jr. and Dick Williams
Set Designer: Charles Mills
Costume Designer: Femi
Lighting Designer: Buddy
Sound Designer: Gary Harris
Production Stage Manager: Horacena J. Taylor
Opened: June 17, 1971 at Theatre De Lys

Cast
 Arthur French - Earl
 Minnie Gentry - Mu'Dear
 Leslie Uggams - Netta
 Louise Stubbs - Mama Rosie
 Kishasha - Billie Jean
 Gloria Edwards - Norma
 Loretta Greene - Ruth Ann
 Stacey Durant - Sheryl
 Troy Warren - Little Earl
 Jimmy Hayeson - Mr. Herbert

Feature film

Directed by Ossie Davis
Producer: Lee Savin
Executive Producer: Robert Greenberg
Distributed by Cinerama Releasing Corporation
Opened: November 9, 1972 in New York City

Cast
 Brock Peters - Earl
 Claudia McNeil - Mu'Dear
 Leslie Uggams - Netta
 Louise Stubbs - Mama Rose
 Peggy Pettitt - Billie Jean
 Gloria Edwards - Norma
 Loretta Greene - Ruth Ann
 Ruby Dee - Netta's Mother
 Kent Martin - Herbert

Other productions

The New Federal Theatre produced a revival of the play during its 1995–96 season. This production was staged by Anderson Johnson.

On Thursday, May 21, 2009, Black Girl was presented by Legros Cultural Arts in New York City.

References

External links
 
 Salisbury Post review of play

1971 plays
African-American plays
American plays adapted into films